The House of Saint Ananias (also called Saint Ananias House or Chapel of Saint Ananias) is an ancient underground structure in Damascus, Syria, that is said to be the remains of the home of Ananias of Damascus, where Ananias baptized Saul (who became Paul the Apostle). The building is at the end of the Street Called Straight near the Bab Sharqi (Eastern Gate).

History
Archaeological excavations in 1921 found the remains of a Byzantine church from the 5th or 6th century AD, adding physical evidence to support local tradition that the chapel has an early-Christian origin.

Gallery

References

5th-century churches
Saint Ananias
Saint Ananias